Ziyadat Allah II ibn Muhammad was the seventh Aghlabid emir of Ifriqiya, ruling from 28 December 863 to his death on 23 December 864. 

Ziyadat Allah rule Ifriqiya during the Extreme instability in Abbasid Caliphate. 
He succeeded his brother, Ahmad, and was succeeded by Ahmad's son Muhammad II.

References

Sources
 

864 deaths
Aghlabid emirs of Ifriqiya